Maggie Gray is an English set decorator. She was nominated for an Academy Award in the category Best Art Direction for the film Brazil and again in 2010 for her work in The Young Victoria. In addition, she won an Emmy Award for The Young Indiana Jones Chronicles.

Selected filmography
 Brazil (1985)
 The Young Victoria (2009)

References

External links

English set decorators
Year of birth missing (living people)
Living people
Emmy Award winners
Place of birth missing (living people)